Bridge plate may refer to:

 Bridge plate (marking), markings on military vehicles to indicate the weight
 Bridge plate (mechanism), equipment used by some light rail vehicles to provide wheelchair access
 A metal or wood plate making up part of the bridge on some stringed instruments.